Zhangeldi is a district of Kostanay Region in northern Kazakhstan. The administrative center of the district is the selo of Torgay. Population:

Geography
Lakes Kushmurun and Sarykopa are located in the district.

References

Districts of Kazakhstan
Kostanay Region